Taylor v. Louisiana, 419 U.S. 522 (1975), was a landmark decision of the US Supreme Court which held that women could not be excluded from a venire, or jury pool, on the basis of having to register for jury duty. The court overturned Hoyt v. Florida, the 1961 case that had allowed such a practice.

Background
Billy J. Taylor was indicted and tried for "aggravated kidnapping" under Louisiana's then-mandatory capital sentencing system. While armed with a butcher knife, he approached an automobile occupied by Mrs. Louise Willie, her daughter, and grandson, forced her to go to an abandoned road near Mandeville, where he raped her before robbing them.  Both parties agreed:

Issues
The issue before the court was not whether Taylor actually kidnapped anyone, but whether he had a fair trial because Louisiana law had a "conceded systematic impact" to eliminate female jurors from his jury:

A secondary issue was whether Taylor had standing, as a man who would not be excluded from jury duty in Louisiana, to challenge the rule.

Decision
The Supreme Court "changed its mind and ruled the affirmative registration process was unconstitutional:"

On the secondary issue of standing, it held:

Reasoning
The Courts' reasoning was based heavily on the precedent from prior case law: "The Court's prior cases are instructive":

Duncan v. Louisiana appears to have been especially important to the court for use as a precedent. It was a significant United States Supreme Court decision, which incorporated the Sixth Amendment right to a jury trial and applied it to the states.

Ballard v. United States (1946), another precedent, concerned the exclusion of "an economic or racial group". Ultimately, the line of cases come from Glasser v. United States (1942), Smith v. Texas (1940), Pierre v. Louisiana (1939), and Strauder v. State of West Virginia (1880), all of which concerned the exclusion of blacks from juries as unconstitutional violations of the Equal Protection Clause.

See also
 Women in United States juries

References

External links
 

1975 in United States case law
United States equal protection and criminal procedure case law
United States jury case law
United States Sixth Amendment jury case law
United States Supreme Court cases
United States Supreme Court cases of the Burger Court
United States Supreme Court decisions that overrule a prior Supreme Court decision
Legal history of Louisiana
American Civil Liberties Union litigation
United States gender discrimination case law
History of women in Louisiana